Cleome  is a genus of flowering plants in the family Cleomaceae, commonly known as spider flowers, spider plants, spider weeds, or bee plants. Previously, it had been placed in the family Capparaceae, until DNA studies found the Cleomaceae genera to be more closely related to the Brassicaceae than the Capparaceae. Cleome and clammyweed (Polanisia dodecandra) can sometimes be confused. The simplest way to differentiate the two is to compare the seedpods which project out or down on cleome and up on clammyweed.

The genus sensu stricto includes about 170 species of herbaceous annual or perennial plants and shrubs. The genus has a subcosmopolitan distribution throughout the tropical and warm temperate regions of the world. However, a recent DNA study failed to separate Cleome, Podandrogyne, and Polanisia from each other, so some taxonomists have abandoned the last two of these genera, treating them as part of Cleome sensu lato; in this case, Cleome contains about 275 species, the vast majority of the Cleomaceae.

This, combined with it being very close to the Brassicaceae with the model plant species Arabidopsis thaliana, makes it an ideal genus in which to study the evolution of  photosynthesis. Also, species such as Cleome gynandra produce proteins needed for  photosynthesis. Three species independently acquired the  pathway, while others are – intermediate or -like.

Selected species
Sources:

Cleome aculeata L., tropical
Cleome angustifolia Forssk.; African – 
Cleome anomala Kunth; neotropical
Cleome arborea Kunth 
Cleome arenitensis Craven, Lepschi & Fryxell 
Cleome aspera Koen. ex DC.
Cleome augustinensis (Hochr.) Briq.
cleome ciliata D.Dian
Cleome chilensis DC. 
Cleome cleomoides (F.Muell.) Iltis
Cleome cordobensis Eichler ex Griseb.
Cleome diffusa Banks ex DC.
Cleome droserifolia Forssk. (Delile)
Cleome eosina J.F.Macbr.
Cleome felina L.f.
Cleome flexuosa F.Dietr.
Cleome foliosa Hook.f.
Cleome gigantea L. 
Cleome glabra Taub. ex Glaz. 
Cleome guianensis Aubl.
Cleome gynandra L. – 
Cleome hassleriana Chodat 
Cleome herrerae J.F.Macbr. 
Cleome hirta (Klotzsch) Oliv. 
Cleome iberica DC. 
Cleome isomeris Greene 
Cleome kenneallyi Hewson	
Cleome lanceolata (Mart. & Zucc.) H.H.Iltis
Cleome lechleri Eichler
Cleome lutea Hook.
Cleome maculata (Sond.) Szyszył.
Cleome micrantha Desv. ex Ham. 
Cleome monophylla L. 
Cleome multicaulis DC. 
Cleome ornithopodioides L. 
Cleome oxalidea F.Muell. – 
Cleome paludosa Willd. ex Eichler
Cleome parviflora Kunth 
Cleome pilosa
Cleome platycarpa Torr. 
Cleome psoraleifolia DC. 
Cleome rubella Burch. 
Cleome rutidosperma DC. 
Cleome serrata Jacq. 
Cleome serrulata Pursh 
Cleome sparsifolia S.Wats.
Cleome speciosa Raf. 
Cleome spinosa Jacq. 
Cleome stenophylla Klotzsch ex Urban
Cleome stylosa Eichler 
Cleome tetrandra DC. 
Cleome titubans Speg. 
Cleome trachycarpa Klotzsch ex Eichler
Cleome tucumanensis H.H.Iltis
Cleome uncifera Kers
Cleome violacea L. 
Cleome viridiflora Schreb. 
Cleome viscosa L. 
Cleome werdermannii A. Ernst
Cleome monophylla

Cultivation and uses

Cleome gynandra is used as a vegetable crop. C. hassleriana is a commonly cultivated ornamental plant with purple, pink, or white flowers.

Gallery of species

References

 
Brassicales genera